Nicholas Bennett (8 May 1823 – 18 August 1899) was a Welsh historian and musician. He was born in Glanrafon, Trefeglwys, Montgomeryshire. His collection of musical works included over 700 Welsh airs. His wrote the songs "Y Cerddor" and  "Songs of the Four Nations". He died in August 1899 is buried in Llanfihangel, Trefeglwys.

References

1823 births
1899 deaths
19th-century Welsh historians
19th-century Welsh musicians
Welsh classical composers
Welsh male classical composers
19th-century British male musicians
People from Montgomeryshire